Toto Looks for a Wife (Italian: Totò cerca moglie) is a 1950 Italian comedy film directed by Carlo Ludovico Bragaglia and starring Totò, Ave Ninchi and Marisa Merlini.

The film's art director was Alberto Boccianti.

Plot
In 1950 in Australia, Aunt Agatha writes to her nephew Toto, informing him she won't send him more money to live in Italy until he gets married. Toto is in fact a happy bachelor who dabbles in sculpture and lives in luxury off his aunt's money. Now Toto's lifestyle is threatened and he's forced to find a partner before his aunt comes to Rome to meet the new couple. Thanks to a friend (Aroldo Tieri), Toto is helped, but the women are horrible or already ammogliate, which causes many misunderstandings. At the end bull is mistaken for a delinquent because of mistaken identity and misunderstanding continues when they come into the house of Toto's aunt and the new "wife", or a woman who is made to pay for pretending to be his wife Toto.

Cast
Totò as Toto
Ave Ninchi	as La zia
Marisa Merlini	as Luisa, the model
Aroldo Tieri as Pippo, the painter
Paul Muller as Carlo secret agent Z-15
Mario Castellani as Filippo
Nerio Bernardi	as Giacinto

Giovanna Galletti  as secret agent K-8
Enzo Garinei as the son of Bellavista (as Vincenzo Garinei)
Zoe Incrocci
Elvi Lissiak as Adelina
Anna Maestri as 
Nino Marchesini as	signor Marco
	as Alberto

References

External links

1950 comedy films
Films directed by Carlo Ludovico Bragaglia
Italian comedy films
Italian black-and-white films
1950s Italian films